Priyutnoye ( Prijutnoe; , Ämtä Nur) is a settlement and the administrative center of Priyutnensky District and Iki-Burulsky rural locality of the Republic of Kalmykia in the Russian Federation. In 2010, its population was 6,010 souls.

An 1848 imperial decree to create settled villages in ethnically Kalmyk areas led to the 1850 founding of a settlement of Russians near the lake of Amtya-Nur (from the Kalmyk  Ämtä Nur, lit. "sweet lake").  Noted scientist Karl Ernst von Baer visited the area in 1856 and tried unsuccessfully to convince the inhabitants to move from the area due to lime concentrations in the lake.

References

Rural localities in Kalmykia
Priyutnensky District